RAF Tilshead is a former Royal Air Force station west of Tilshead, Wiltshire, England and  east of Warminster.

The unpaved airfield was open from 1925 until 1941. Nearby at Shrewton, a relief landing ground controlled by No. 38 Wing RAF was open from 1940 to 1946.

Based units

No. 16 Squadron RAF flew the Westland Lysander as a detachment for RAF Weston Zoyland between 15 August 1940 and 8 September 1941, conducting reconnaissance protecting the country from the planned invasion and looking for enemy movements.

No. 225 (Army Co-operation) Squadron RAF also flew the Lysander before moving to RAF Thruxton.

The airfield also provided initial training period for the Glider Pilot Regiment providing basic flying training.

Current use

The site is currently used by the British Army as part of the Salisbury Plain training area and there is nothing left of the airfield.

References

External links

 BBC History - Staff Sergeant Billy Marfleet GPR

Royal Air Force stations in Wiltshire
Military units and formations established in 1925
Royal Air Force stations of World War II in the United Kingdom